Meg Johnson may refer to:

 Meg Johnson (actress) (born 1936), English actress
 Meg Johnson, American poet
 Meg Johnson, a character in Light in the Piazza, a 1962 film

See also
 Margaret Johnson (disambiguation)
 Megan Johnson, a New York City Ballet dancer